John Vanbrugh created many disparate works, and this is a list of many of the notable ones.

 Castle Howard, c. 1699 (west wing designed by Sir Thomas Robinson only completed in early 19th century).
 The architect's own house in Whitehall, 1700–1701, known as "Goose-Pie House", demolished 1898.
 The Orangery, Kensington Palace, 1704: probably a modification by Vanbrugh to a design by Hawksmoor.
 Haymarket Theatre, 1704–05, has been completely rebuilt since and is now known as Her Majesty's.
 Blenheim Palace, 1705–1722, stable court never completed.
 Grand Bridge, Blenheim, 1708–1722.
 Kimbolton Castle, 1708–1719, remodelled the building.
 Demolished part of Audley End and designed new Grand Staircase, 1708.
 Claremont House, 1708, then known as Chargate (rebuilt to the designs of Henry Holland in the 18th century).
 Kings Weston House, 1710–1714.
 Grimsthorpe Castle, 1715–1730, only the north side of the courtyard was rebuilt.
 Eastbury Park, 1713–1738, completed by Roger Morris who amended Vanbrugh's design (demolished except for Kitchen Wing).
Cholmondeley Castle 1713 Vanbrugh prepared a design to rebuild the house, but it is believed not to have been executed
Great Obelisk, Castle Howard 1714
 Morpeth Town Hall, 1714. (Front renewed and back replaced in 1869–70.)
 The Belvedere, Claremont Landscape Garden, 1715.
 Vanbrugh Castle, 1718–19, the architect's own house in Greenwich. Additionally, houses for other members of Vanbrugh's family (none of which survived beyond 1910).
 Stowe, Buckinghamshire, c.1719, added north portico, also several temples and follies in the gardens (the surviving follies are: the Wolfe Obelisk (c.1720), relocated 1759; the Rotunda (1720–21) dome altered; the Lake Pavilions (c.1719) altered) up until his death.
The Temple, Eastbury Park (early 1720s) demolished
Robin Hood's Well, Yorkshire C.1720
 Seaton Delaval Hall, 1720–1728.
 Lumley Castle, 1722, remodelling work.
Pyramid Gate, Castle Howard 1723
Walled Kitchen Garden, Claremont (c.1723)
 Newcastle Pew, St George's Church, Esher, 1724.
The Bagnio (water pavilion), Eastbury Park (1725) demolished
 Temple of the Four Winds, Castle Howard, 1725–1728.

Attributed works include:

 Completion of State rooms, Hampton Court Palace, 1716–1718.
 Ordnance Board Building, Woolwich, 1716–1720.
Chatham Dockyard Great Store House 1717, now demolished,  Vanburgh or Hawksmoor were possibly involved in the design
 Berwick Barracks, 1717–1721.
The Brewhouse, Kings Weston House (c.1718)
Chatham Dockyard Main gate 1720, is possibly by Vanburgh or Hawksmoor
Loggia, Kings Weston House (c.1722)

Gallery of architectural work

Notes and references
 

John Vanbrugh